Carol Elaine Channing (January 31, 1921 – January 15, 2019) was an American actress, singer, dancer and comedian who starred in Broadway and film musicals. Her characters usually had a fervent expressiveness and an easily identifiable voice, whether singing or for comedic effect.

Channing originated the lead roles in Gentlemen Prefer Blondes in 1949 and Hello, Dolly! in 1964, winning the Tony Award for Best Actress in a Musical for the latter. She revived both roles several times throughout her career, playing Dolly on Broadway for the final time in 1995. She was nominated for her first Tony Award in 1956 for The Vamp, followed by a nomination in 1961 for Show Girl. She received her fourth Tony Award nomination for the musical Lorelei in 1974.

As a film actress, she won the Golden Globe Award and was nominated for the Academy Award for Best Supporting Actress for her performance as Muzzy in Thoroughly Modern Millie (1967). Her other film appearances include The First Traveling Saleslady (1956) and Skidoo (1968). On television, she appeared as an entertainer on variety shows. She performed The White Queen in the TV production of Alice in Wonderland (1985), and she had the first of many TV specials in 1966, titled An Evening with Carol Channing.

Channing was inducted into the American Theater Hall of Fame in 1981 and received a Lifetime Achievement Tony Award in 1995. She continued to perform and make appearances well into her 90s, singing songs from her repertoire and sharing stories with fans, cabaret-style. She was one of the "legends" interviewed in the award-winning documentary, Broadway: The Golden Age, by the Legends Who Were There. She released her autobiography Just Lucky I Guess in 2002, and Larger Than Life was released in 2012, a documentary film about her career.

Early life
Channing was born in Seattle, Washington, on January 31, 1921, the only child of Adelaide (née Glaser; 1886–1984) and George Channing (1888–1957). Her father, who was born George Christian Stucker, was multiracial (African-American and Euro-American) and changed his surname due to religious reasons before Carol's birth. He became a Christian Science practitioner, editor, and teacher. George Channing's mother, Clara, was African-American, and his father, George Stucker, was the son of German immigrants. Carol's maternal grandparents, Otto Glaser, and Paulina Ottmann, were both of German-Jewish origin. A city editor at The Seattle Star, he took a job in San Francisco and the family moved to California when Channing was two years old.

Channing attended Aptos Junior High School and Lowell High School in San Francisco, graduating in 1938. She won the Crusaders' Oratorical Contest and a free trip to Hawaii with her mother in June 1937. When she was 17, she left home to attend Bennington College in Vermont and her mother told her for the first time that her father's mother was African American and his father was German American. Her mother felt that the time was right to tell her since now that she was going off to college and would be on her own, she didn't want her to be surprised if she ever had a Black baby. Channing wrote: Channing publicly revealed her African-American ancestry in 2002.

Channing majored in drama at Bennington and during an interview in 1994 revealed that she first wanted to perform on stage as a singer when she was in the fourth grade. She recalled being emotionally drawn to the stage after seeing Ethel Waters perform.

Channing stated that in the fourth grade she ran for and was elected class secretary: "I stood up in class and campaigned by kidding the teachers. The other kids laughed. I loved the feeling — it was a very good feeling; it still is." She read the class minutes every Friday, often impersonating the children who were discussed. She also considers the fact that she was able to see plays while very young to have been an important inspiration:

Her election to class secretary continued through grammar and high school: "It was very good training—like stock." Those weekly sessions in front of students became a habit which she carried to Bennington College, where she would entertain every Friday night. During her junior year, she began trying out for acting parts on Broadway. After playing a small part in the revue, The New Yorker noted her performance: "You'll be hearing more from a comedienne named Carol Channing." The inspiration she received from that brief notice made her decide to quit school. However, it was four years before she found another acting job. During that period, she performed at small functions or benefits, including some in the Catskill resorts. She also worked in Macy's bakery.

Career

Stage
Channing was introduced to the stage while helping her mother deliver newspapers to the backstage of theatres.

Her first job on stage in New York City was in Marc Blitzstein's No for an Answer, starting January 1941, at the Mecca Temple (later New York City Center). She was 19 years old. Channing moved to Broadway for Let's Face It!, in which she was an understudy for Eve Arden, who was 13 years older than Channing. Much later, in 1966, Arden was hired to play the title role in Hello Dolly! in a road company after Channing left to star in the film Thoroughly Modern Millie. Channing won the Sarah Siddons Award for her work in Chicago's theatres in 1966 (Eve Arden won the next year).

Five years later, Channing had a featured role in Lend an Ear (1948), for which she received her Theatre World Award and launched her as a star performer. Channing credited illustrator Al Hirschfeld for helping make her a star when he put her image in his widely published illustrations. She said that his drawing of her as a flapper was what helped her get the lead in her next play, the Jule Styne and Anita Loos musical Gentlemen Prefer Blondes. From that role, as Lorelei Lee, she gained recognition, with her signature song from the production, "Diamonds Are a Girl's Best Friend," among the most widely known.

In January 1950, Time magazine ran a cover story about her becoming a new star on Broadway, followed by cover stories in Life magazine in 1955 and 1964.

In 1956, Channing married her manager and publicist Charles Lowe. During the 1950s, he produced the Burns and Allen comedy show, which starred George Burns and Gracie Allen. When Allen was forced to discontinue performing due to her heart ailments, she saw that Burns was in need of a partner to play against on stage since he was best as a straight man. She remembered that Channing, like she, had one of the most distinctive and recognizable voices in show business, and Lowe asked Channing if she would perform with Burns during his shows. She accepted immediately, and Channing worked on and off with Burns through the late 1950s. Burns also appeared in her TV special, An Evening with Carol Channing, in 1966.

In 1961, Channing became one of the few performers nominated for a Tony Award for work in a revue (rather than a traditional book musical); she was nominated for Best Actress in a Musical for the short-lived revue Show Girl.

Channing came to national prominence as the star of Jerry Herman's Hello, Dolly! (1964). Her performance as Dolly Levi won the Tony Award for Best Actress in a Musical. She recalled that playwright Thornton Wilder so loved the musical, which was based on his play, The Matchmaker, that he came once a week. He also planned to rewrite his 1942 play The Skin of Our Teeth, with Channing playing the parts of both Mrs. Antrobus and Sabina but died before he could finish it.

Approval of her performance in the 1960s meant she was often invited to major events, including those at the White House, where she might sing. Channing was a registered Democrat and was invited to the Democratic convention in 1964 in Atlantic City, New Jersey where she sang "Hello, Lyndon" for Lyndon B. Johnson's campaign. She was a favorite of Lady Bird Johnson, who once gave her a huge bouquet after a show. In 1967, she also became the first celebrity to perform at the Super Bowl halftime show.

The old-fashioned plot of Hello, Dolly, when first described, might seem uninspired, says columnist Dick Kleiner:

The show had first opened on Broadway on January 16, 1964, and by the time the show closed in late December 1970, it had become the longest-running musical in Broadway history, with nearly 3,000 performances. Besides Channing, six other stars played the title role during those seven years: Ginger Rogers, Martha Raye, Betty Grable, Pearl Bailey, Phyllis Diller and Ethel Merman.

Al Hirschfeld's illustration of her was printed on the front page of the "Sunday Theatre" section of The New York Times. She felt that this image captured the essence of her character, having posited in writing, "How did the great Hirschfeld know precisely what I was thinking? ... To be Hirschfelded is an eerie experience. You better not have anything to hide, because he'll expose it like a neon sign" ... The illustration was also printed on the cover of magazines, including Horizon. She later appeared in the movie biography about his life, The Line King, in 1996.

Channing reprised her role of Lorelei Lee when the musical Lorelei, directed by Robert Moore and choreographed by Ernest O. Flatt, premiered in 1973 at the Oklahoma City (6000 seat) Civic Center Music Hall and broke all box office records after six days' worth of performances sold out within 24 hours.

To commemorate this record event, the street running in front of the Music Hall was renamed Channing Square Drive in her honor. Also in the cast were Peter Palmer, Brandon Maggart, Dody Goodman, and Lee Roy Reams. For nearly a year, the stage musical then toured 11 cities across the country. Lorelei had earned a hefty profit by the time it opened on Broadway at the Palace Theatre on January 27, 1974, and ran for a total of 320 performances. Channing also appeared in two New York City revivals of Hello, Dolly!, and toured with it extensively throughout the United States.

She performed songs from Hello, Dolly during a special television show in London in 1979.

Film
Channing also appeared in a number of films, including The First Traveling Saleslady (1956), in which she gave future star Clint Eastwood his first onscreen kiss; the cult film Skidoo; and Thoroughly Modern Millie (starring Julie Andrews, Mary Tyler Moore, John Gavin, and Beatrice Lillie). For Millie she received a nomination for the Academy Award for Best Supporting Actress, and was awarded a Golden Globe Award for Best Supporting Actress – Motion Picture. Channing said she was especially grateful to Andrews for helping her develop her character: "She will forever be my angel," she says.

Due to her success on Broadway in Hello Dolly! and her co-starring role in Thoroughly Modern Millie, Channing attracted the attention of Lucille Ball and Desi Arnaz, who were interested in starring her in a sitcom. Directed and produced by Arnaz and written by Bob Carroll Jr. and Madelyn Davis (who co-wrote I Love Lucy and The Lucy Show), The Carol Channing Show starred Channing as Carol Hunnicut, a small-town girl trying and failing to make it in New York City show business. Character actors Richard Deacon and Jane Dulo were in the supporting cast. The pilot was filmed in front of a live audience (with a laugh track added) at Desilu in 1966 but did not sell as a series.

During her film career, Channing also made some guest appearances on television sitcoms and talk shows, including What's My Line? where she appeared in 11 episodes from 1962 to 1966. Channing did voice-over work in cartoons, most notably as Grandmama in an animated version of The Addams Family from 1992 to 1995.

Television
During most of her career, Channing was asked to perform in various skits or appear as a guest on regular shows. In the 1960s, she was on The Andy Williams Show.  In 1974, she participated in the television special Free to Be... You and Me, based on Marlo Thomas' best-selling album of 1972, in which Channing also appeared. Free... won the Emmy Award for Outstanding Children's Special and The Peabody Award. In 1985, she played the role of the White Queen in the television special Alice in Wonderland. In 1986, Channing appeared on Sesame Street and sang a parody of the song "Hello, Dolly!" called "Hello, Sammy!", a love song being sung by Carol to a character known as Sammy the Snake (as voiced by Muppets creator Jim Henson). Carol, in this parody segment, serenades Sammy telling him just how much she loves and adores him while Sammy coils himself around Carol's arms. Carol's song includes lyrics such as: "So..turn on your charm, Sammy/Coil yourself around my arm, Sammy/Sammy the Snake, I'll stake a claim on you". Songwriter Jule Styne, who wrote the score for Gentlemen Prefer Blondes, invited her on his television special in 1987 where she performed another one of her signature songs, "Little Girl from Little Rock".

In 1993, she poked a little fun at herself in an episode of The Nanny. The episode "Smoke Gets in Your Lies" shows the producer auditioning for a new musical, and Channing, playing herself, is trying out. Just after the producer announces he wants a stage presence that is instantly recognizable to the entire country, Channing begins with her signature "Hello, Dolly!", but he stops her with a resounding "Next!".

In January 2003, Channing recorded the audiobook of her best-selling autobiography Just Lucky, I Guess: A Memoir of Sorts, directed and produced by Steve Garrin at VideoActive Productions in New York City. It was during the recording sessions that she received a phone call from her childhood sweetheart Harry Kullijian that rekindled their romance and led to their marriage a few months later. In January 2012, the documentary Carol Channing: Larger Than Life (which chronicles Channing's life and career) was released.

Personal life

Channing was married four times. Her first husband was Theodore Naidish, whom she married when she was 20 in 1941. He was a writer, who in 1944 wrote Watch Out for Willie Carter, but during the nearly five years of their marriage, earned little income: "There was no money for food, clothing or housing." Still, Channing adored his émigré Jewish family, stating, in her memoir, "There is nothing so safe and secure as an immigrant, foreign-language-speaking family all around you. It was a dream come true for me. They look after you, you look after them. They make chick'n in the pot if you're sick. You learn marvelous new-sounding words every minute." Channing and Naidish lived near his grandparents in Brighton Beach in the borough of Brooklyn in New York City. She remembered his grandfather Sam Cohen introducing her to some of his neighborhood friends, who were amazed that she enjoyed hearing their funny stories. "They were delighted that I almost ate them up alive," she wrote, "because they were so funny, especially since such appreciation was coming from what we all thought then was a shiksa (me)." She learned to speak fluent Yiddish from "Grandpa Cohen", a skill that helped her understand the boardwalk conversations that went on around her in town.

Her second husband Alexander F. Carson, known as Axe, or "The Murderous Ax", played center for the Ottawa Rough Riders Canadian football team and was also a private detective. They married in 1950 and divorced in September 1956. They had one son named Channing Carson.

In September 1956, "Immediately following the entry of the divorce decree" from Carson, Channing married her manager and publicist Charles Lowe. In 1960, Carson's parental rights were severed due to his abandonment, and his and Channing's son took his stepfather's surname. As the judge stated, "The differences in environment and miles would result in a gross injustice in itself to the child, who at this very tender stage does not even know what his real father looks like. He probably doesn't even realize that the present husband of Mrs. Channing is not his father." Channing Lowe publishes his cartoons as Chan Lowe. Channing filed for divorce from Lowe in 1998, but her estranged husband died before the divorce was finalized.

After Lowe's death and until shortly before her fourth marriage, the actress's companion was Roger Denny, an interior decorator.

In 2003, while recording the audiobook of her autobiography Just Lucky, I Guess, at VideoActive Productions, NYC, produced and directed by Steve Garrin, she rekindled her romance with her junior high school sweetheart, Harry Kullijian, and they married on May 10, 2003. They later performed at their old junior high school in a benefit for the school. They also promoted arts education in California schools through their Dr. Carol Channing and Harry Kullijian Foundation. The couple resided in both Modesto, California, and Rancho Mirage, California. Harry Kullijian died on December 26, 2011, the eve of his 92nd birthday.

Channing had unique dietary habits. In 1978, she said she had not eaten restaurant food in 15 years and preferred only organic food. When invited to restaurants, she would bring several sealed containers with her own food, such as zucchine or chopped celery, and simply ask for an empty plate and glass. For dessert, she would eat seeds. By 1995, Channing had resumed eating food served by restaurants. However, she would not drink alcoholic beverages of any sort. Channing was a survivor of ovarian cancer.

Channing died from natural causes on January 15, 2019, at her home in Rancho Mirage, California, at the age of 97. On January 16, the lights on Broadway were dimmed in honor of Channing. A crowd congregated outside the St. James Theatre, as it had also been the anniversary of the opening of the original Broadway production of Hello, Dolly!. Her ashes were sprinkled between the Curran Theatre and the Geary Theater in San Francisco.

Legacy and honors

 1970, Channing was the first celebrity to perform at a Super Bowl halftime.
 In 1973, it came to light during the Watergate hearings that Channing was on a master list of Nixon's political opponents, informally known as Nixon's "enemies list". She subsequently said that her appearance on this list was the highest honor in her career.
 1981, Channing was inducted into the American Theater Hall of Fame.
 1984, Lowell High School renamed its auditorium The Carol Channing Theatre in her honor.
 1988, The city of San Francisco, California, proclaimed February 14, 1988, to be "Carol Channing Day."
 1995, she was awarded a Lifetime Achievement Tony Award.
 2004, she was awarded an honorary doctorate in Fine Arts by California State University, Stanislaus.
 2004, she received the Oscar Hammerstein Award for Lifetime Achievement in Musical Theatre.
 2010, a Golden Palm Star on the Palm Springs Walk of Stars was dedicated to her.
 In December 2010, Channing was honored at Broadway Cares/Equity Fights AIDS Gypsy of the Year competition.

Theater 
{| class="wikitable sortable"
|+
!Year
!Title
!Role
!Notes
|-
| rowspan="2" |1941
|No for an Answer
|
|
|-
|Let's Face It!
|Maggie Watson
|Understudy for Eve Arden
|-
|1942
|Proof Thro' the Night
|Steve
|
|-
|1948
|Lend an Ear
|Mrs. Playgoer
|
|-
|1949–52
|Gentlemen Prefer Blondes
|Lorelei Lee
|
|-
|1953
|Pygmalion
|Eliza Doolittle
|
|-
|1954
|Wonderful Town
|Ruth Sherwood
|Replacement for Rosalind Russell
|-
|1955
|The Vamp
|Flora Weems
|
|-
|1959
|Show Business
|
|
|-
|1961
|Show Girl
|Lynn
|
|-
|1963
|The Millionairess
|Epifania Ognisanti di Parerga
|
|-
|1964–66; 1977–79; 1981–83; 1994–96
|Hello, Dolly!
|Mrs. Dolly Gallagher Levi
|
|-
|1971
|Four on a Garden
|Mrs. Dunkelmayer, Betty, Irene, Mrs. Wexel
|
|-
|1973–75
|Lorelei 
|Lorelei Lee
|
|-
|1974
|Jule's Friends at the Palace
|Herself
|Broadway Special; benefit concert
|-
|1976
|The Bed Before Yesterday
|
|
|-
|1980
|Sugar Babies
|Carol (Herself)
|
|-
|1984
|Jerry's Girls 
|Herself
|
|-
|1985
|Legends! 
|Sylvia Glenn
|
|-
|1987
|Happy Birthday, Mr. Abbott!
|Herself
|Broadway Special; benefit concert
|-
|1988
|Broadway at the Bowl
|Herself
|
|-
|1991
|Give My Regards to Broadway
|Herself
|Broadway Special; benefit concert
|-
|2003
|Singular Sensations
|Herself
|
|-
|2004
|Razzle Dazzle!
|
|
|-
| rowspan="2" |2014
|Hello, Dolly! 50th Anniversary
| rowspan="2" |Herself
| rowspan="2" |
|-
|Time Steppin'''
|-
|2016
|95th Birthday in Celebration of a Broadway Legend
|Herself
|}

Filmography

Discography

Awards and nominations

Notes

References

Further reading
 Just Lucky I Guess: A Memoir of Sorts by Carol Channing (Simon & Schuster, 2002)
 Diary of a Mad Playwright: Perilous Adventures on the Road with Mary Martin and Carol Channing by James Kirkwood, Jr., about production of the play Legends (Dutton, 1989)

External links

 
 
 
 
 Carol Channing – Downstage Center'' interview at American Theatre Wing.org
 TonyAwards.com Interview with Carol Channing
 American Foundation for Arts Education 
 

1921 births
2019 deaths
21st-century American comedians
20th-century American actresses
21st-century American actresses
20th-century American singers
21st-century American singers
20th-century American women singers
21st-century American women singers
Actresses from San Francisco
Actresses from Seattle
African-American actresses
African-American female comedians
African-American women singers
American Christian Scientists
Entertainers from Washington (state)
American film actresses
American memoirists
American musical theatre actresses
American people of German-Jewish descent
People of African-American descent
American stage actresses
American television actresses
American voice actresses
American women comedians
Audiobook narrators
Bennington College alumni
Best Supporting Actress Golden Globe (film) winners
California Democrats
Lowell High School (San Francisco) alumni
Musicians from Seattle
Musicians from San Francisco
Nixon's Enemies List
Neighborhood Playhouse School of the Theatre alumni
RCA Victor artists
Special Tony Award recipients
Tony Award winners
Washington (state) Democrats
People from Aptos, California